Al-Hakim Abu al-Qasim Ishaq al-Samarqandi, was a Sunni-Hanafi scholar, qadi (judge), and sage from Transoxania who studied Sufism in Balkh with Abu Bakr al-Warraq. Some sources describe him as a student of al-Maturidi (d. 333/944-45) in fiqh and kalam.

He was proficient in kalam and authored a Hanafi creedal statement that insists on the need for obedience to any duly appointed ruler. The creed criticizes the harsh asceticism of the Karramiyya and accepts traditional views of saintly marvels (karamat).

Abu al-Qasim's life marked a turning-point in the formation of the ascetic doctrines and teachings of Hanafi Sunnis in the east, and his al-Sawad al-A'zam was for a long time a major reference source on doctrine for many Hanafis-Maturidis. Although it is not yet clear whether al-Hakim was a disciple of al-Maturidi, or whether his handbook was a mere traditional document on Hanafite doctrine.

Name 
Abu al-Qasim Ishaq b. Muhammad b. Isma'il b. Ibrahim b. Zayd al-Hakim al-Samarqandi.

Birth 
His exact date of birth is unknown, although some modern biographers place the date to sometime around 260/874.

Life 
Little is known about his life. He lived from the end of the 3rd/9th to the first half of the 4th/10th century.

Death 
He died in Samarkand and was buried at Jakardiza, a place reserved for prominent scholars and persons of nobility. The date of his death is uncertain, some placing it in 340 AH, others in 342 AH, and others in 345 AH. And it was being said in 402 AH.

Abu al-Mu'in al-Nasafi (d. 508/1114) has praised him in his book Tabsirat al-Adilla, and according to him, the date of his death was 335 AH.

See also 
 Abu Bakr al-Samarqandi
 Abu al-Layth al-Samarqandi
 Shams al-Din al-Samarqandi
 List of Hanafis
 List of Sufis
 List of Muslim theologians
 List of Ash'aris and Maturidis

Notes

References

External links 
 Abu al-Qasim Ishaq al-Hakim al-Samarqandi — Encyclopaedia Iranica
 Folio from a manuscript of tafsir (Qur'anic exegesis), text originally by Abū al-Qāsim al-Ḥakīm al-Samarqandī

Hanafis
Maturidis
Sunni Sufis
Sunni imams
Sunni Muslim scholars of Islam
10th-century Muslim theologians
People from Samarkand
870s births
950s deaths
Year of birth uncertain
Year of death uncertain